Porte Molitor, along with the station Haxo makes up a part of the Ghost stations of the Paris Métro that have never seen a single passenger.  It is situated in the 16th arrondissement of Paris.

The station

A station with a central platform is found here and is called Murat or Porte Molitor.

This station was originally intended to service the Parc des Princes stadium on matchdays.  However, access to the station was never constructed and the station today serves as storage sidings for trains.

The station's tracks merge into a single track at both ends of the station, so the station would have been served in only one direction (southbound) had it been opened.

Station layout

See also
Haxo, a never-opened station on the Paris Metro
North End tube station, never-opened station on the London Underground
Kymlinge, a never-opened station on the Stockholm Metro
Unused stations on the Helsinki Metro

References

External links

 Brief description of the station at Jean-Christophe Patats Magic Paris website

Paris Métro stations in the 16th arrondissement of Paris
Ghost stations of the Paris Métro